In rugby union, a Grand Slam occurs when one team in the Six Nations Championship (or its Five Nations predecessor) beats all the others during one year's competition.  This has been achieved 42 times in total, for the first time by Wales in 1908, and most recently by the Irish team in 2023. The team with the most Grand Slams is England with 13.
It can also apply to the U20 and Women's Six Nations Championships.

In another context, a Grand Slam tour refers to a touring side – South Africa, Australia or New Zealand – which plays fixtures against all four home nations (England, Ireland, Scotland and Wales) during their tour. If the tourists win all of those matches, they are said to have achieved a Grand Slam. This has been done nine times, first by South Africa in 1912–13, and most recently by New Zealand in 2010.

Five and Six Nations Grand Slams

In the annual Six Nations Championship (among England, Ireland, Scotland, Wales, France and Italy), and its predecessor the Five Nations Championship (before Italy joined in 2000), a Grand Slam occurs when one team beats all of the others during one year's competition. The Grand Slam winners are awarded the Six Nations trophy (as tournament winners), but there is no special grand slam trophy – the Grand Slam is an informal honour recognising a Championship-winning team which has won all their games.

A Grand Slam was therefore available in a total of 97 seasons to date. Grand Slams have been achieved 42 times – 13 by England, 12 by Wales, 10 by France, 4 by Ireland and 3 by Scotland. (Italy, involved in the tournament since 2000, have yet to win a Grand Slam.)

Two consecutive Grand Slams have been won by Wales in 1908–1909, by England in 1913–1914, 1923–1924 and 1991–1992, and by France in 1997–1998. No team has yet achieved three consecutive Grand Slams.

Prior to 2000, each team played four matches, two at home and two away from home. Following the inclusion of Italy in 2000, each team plays five matches, two at home and three away in one year, and the opposite in the following season. When Wales won the Grand Slam in 2005, it was the first time that the feat had been achieved by a team that had played more matches away than at home. This was repeated by Ireland in 2009 and 2023, by England in 2016, and by Wales in 2019.

Since 2017, the Six Nations Championship has used bonus points. A team that wins the Grand Slam will get three bonus points. This eliminates the possibility of a Grand Slam winner losing the championship on bonus points.

Table of Grand Slam winners

* In 1908 and 1909 matches with France were played, although they were not part of the Championship.

Chronological list of Grand Slam winners

Grand Slam tours
If the tourists win all four of these games, they are said to have achieved a Grand Slam.

Some Grand Slam tours also include a Test match against ; South Africa achieved a "Five Nations Grand Slam" in 1912–13 and 1951–52.

Grand Slams by touring teams have been achieved nine times: four times each by South Africa and New Zealand, and once by Australia.

Australia is the only country to have lost against all four home nations during a Grand Slam tour, on their 1957–58 tour.  Australia also lost to France on that tour.

After 1984, Southern Hemisphere sides started to tour the British Isles more frequently, but to play fewer Tests on each tour, and thus there were no Grand Slam tours between 1984 and 1998. However, since 1998 Grand Slam tours have again become quite common, as the number of Tests on each tour has increased. The All Blacks' tours of 2005 and 2008 were originally planned to include only three Test matches; the late inclusion of matches against Wales and England respectively turned these into Grand Slam tours.

Grand Slams achieved by touring sides

Grand Slam tours

The Rugby Championship

Rugby Europe Championship

See also
 Six Nations Championship
 Triple Crown
 Six Nations Wooden Spoon
 Calcutta Cup

References

External links
 The Official Six Nations Site 
 2008 Six Nations Information and Tournament Guide
 BBC News article on past Grand Slam tours
 Pathe News coverage of 1924 England Grand Slam